Polygamy is legal in Chad, and it is estimated that over a third of women live in polygamous marriages. 

As of 2011, about half the Chadian Christian practice polygamy.

References 

Society of Chad
Chad